MSQ may refer to:
 the IATA airport code of Minsk National Airport, in Belarus ;
 the Minnesota Satisfaction Questionnaire, a survey used to measure job satisfaction in work organizations.
 The Million Second Quiz, a short-lived 2013 NBC game show.